In mathematics, a logical matrix may be described as d-disjunct and/or d-separable. These concepts play a pivotal role in the mathematical area of non-adaptive group testing.

In the mathematical literature, d-disjunct matrices may also be called super-imposed codes or d-cover-free families.

According to Chen and Hwang (2006),

 A matrix is said to be d-separable if no two sets of d columns have the same boolean sum.
 A matrix is said to be -separable (that's d with an overline) if no two sets of d-or-fewer columns have the same boolean sum.
 A matrix is said to be d-disjunct if no set of d columns has a boolean sum which is a superset of any other single column.

The following relationships are "well-known":

 Every -separable matrix is also -disjunct.
 Every -disjunct matrix is also -separable.
 Every -separable matrix is also -separable (by definition).

Concrete examples
The following  matrix is 2-separable, because each pair of columns has a distinct sum.

However, this matrix is not 3-separable, because the sum of columns 1, 2, and 3 (namely ) equals the sum of columns 1, 4, and 5.

This matrix is also not -separable, because the sum of columns 1 and 8 (namely ) equals the sum of column 1 alone. In fact, no matrix with an all-zero column can possibly be -separable for any .

The following  matrix is -separable (and thus 2-disjunct) but not 3-disjunct.

There are 15 possible ways to choose 3-or-fewer columns from this matrix, and each choice leads to a different boolean sum:

However, the sum of columns 2, 3, and 4 (namely ) is a superset of column 1 (namely ), which means that this matrix is not 3-disjunct.

Application of d-separability to group testing

The non-adaptive group testing problem postulates that we have a test which can tell us, for any set of items, whether that set contains a defective item. We are asked to come up with a series of groupings that can exactly identify all the defective items in a batch of n total items, some d of which are defective.

A -separable matrix with  rows and  columns concisely describes how to use t tests to find the defective items in a batch of n, where the number of defective items is known to be exactly d.

A -disjunct matrix (or, more generally, any -separable matrix) with  rows and  columns concisely describes how to use t tests to find the defective items in a batch of n, where the number of defective items is known to be no more than d.

Practical concerns and published results
In the limit, for a given n and d, the number of rows t in the smallest d-separable  matrix will tend to be smaller than the number of rows t in the smallest d-disjunct  matrix. However, if the matrix is to be used for practical testing, some algorithm is needed that can "decode" a test result (that is, a boolean sum such as ) into the indices of the defective items (that is, the unique set of columns that produce that boolean sum). For arbitrary d-separable but non-d-disjunct matrices, the best known decoding algorithms are exponential-time.

Porat and Rothschild (2008) present a deterministic -time algorithm for constructing a d-disjoint matrix with n columns and  rows.

See also
 Group testing
 Concatenated code
 Compressed sensing

References

Further reading
 Atri Rudra's book on Error Correcting Codes: Combinatorics, Algorithms, and Applications (Spring 201), Chapter 17
 Dýachkov, A. G., & Rykov, V. V. (1982). Bounds on the length of disjunctive codes. Problemy Peredachi Informatsii [Problems of Information Transmission], 18(3), 7–13.
 Dýachkov, A. G., Rashad, A. M., & Rykov, V. V. (1989). Superimposed distance codes. Problemy Upravlenija i Teorii Informacii [Problems of Control and Information Theory], 18(4), 237–250.
 

Combinatorics